The Křižanov Highlands is a highland and a geomorphological mesoregion of the Czech Republic. It is located mostly in the Vysočina Region.

Geomorphology
The Křižanov Highlands is a mesoregion of the Bohemian-Moravian Highlands within the Bohemian Massif. It borders other mesoregions of the Bohemian-Moravian Highlands.

Geology
The highlands, together with the Upper Svratka Highlands and Jevišovice Uplands threshold, form the Western-Moravian part of Moldanubian Zone.

Pedology
The primary composition of the range is migmatite, granite and gneis. Soil horizon is mainly fluvisol and cambisol.

Geography
The area has a horseshoe shape that extends from Tišnov in the east, to Žďár nad Sázavou in the northwest and Jemnice in the southwest.

The rivers that originates here include Jihlava, Oslava, and Thaya.

The most populated settlements in the territory are Jihlava (smaller part), Žďár nad Sázavou, Velké Meziříčí, Nové Město na Moravě, Dačice, Třešť, and Velká Bíteš.

Vegetation
The mountain range is 47% forested, plantations only – spruces, limes, maples, birches.

Gallery

References
 Geografický místopisný slovník, Academia, Praha, 1993. 

Mountain ranges of the Czech Republic
Geography of the Vysočina Region
Moravia
Bohemia
Highlands